The 2026 FIFA World Cup qualification will be the qualifying process which will decide the teams that will join hosts Canada, Mexico, and the United States at the 2026 FIFA World Cup.

Qualified countries

Notes

Qualification process

On 9 May 2017, the FIFA Council approved the slot allocation scheme for the new 48-team final format.

Summary of qualification

Confederation qualification

AFC

On 1 August 2022, the Asian Football Confederation Executive Committee approved the qualification format for Asia's road to the 2026 World Cup, as well as the 2027 AFC Asian Cup, in preparation for the eight direct spots and the single intercontinental play-off slot allocated to the AFC by FIFA following the expansion of the FIFA World Cup to 48 teams.

The qualification structure is as follows:
First round: Twenty-two teams (ranked 26–47) will play home-and-away over two legs. The eleven winners advance to the second round.
Second round: Thirty-six teams (those ranked 1–25 and the eleven first-round winners) are divided into nine groups of four teams to play home-and-away round-robin matches. The eighteen group winners and group runners-up advance to the third round. 
Third round: The eighteen teams that advance from the second round are divided into three groups of six teams to play home-and-away round-robin matches. The top two teams of each group qualify for the World Cup, while the third-placed and fourth-placed teams of each group advance to the fourth round.
Fourth round: The six teams that advance from the third round are divided into two groups of three teams each to play a single round-robin. The winners qualify for the World Cup.
Fifth round: The group runners-up in the previous round will compete in a play-off tie to determine the Asian representation at the inter-confederation play-offs.

CAF

To be decided.

CONCACAF

Three nations in CONCACAF—Canada, Mexico and the United States—automatically qualified as host nations. On 28 February 2023, CONCACAF announced the qualifying format for 2026 World Cup qualification.

First round: Four CONCACAF teams, ranked 29 to 32 based on the FIFA rankings of November 2023, will be divided into two matchups, played on a two-legged home-and-away basis. The two winners will advance to the second round.
Second round: Thirty teams, the two winners from the first round and CONCACAF teams ranked 1 to 28 based on the FIFA rankings of November 2023, will be drawn into six groups of five teams. They will play single round-robin matches (two home and two away), with group winners and runners-up qualifying for the third round.
Third round: The twelve teams advancing from the second round will be drawn into three groups of four teams. They will play double round-robin home-and-away matches, with the three group winners qualifying for the World Cup. The two best-ranked runners-up will advance to the inter-confederation play-offs.

CONMEBOL

On 22 August 2022, CONMEBOL petitioned FIFA to keep the current qualification format, which has been used since the 1998 FIFA World Cup qualification. This was confirmed, with the first games of the qualifiers to be played in 2023.

Prior to the commencement of the qualification competition, Ecuador were deducted 3 points for falsifying birth documents for Byron Castillo in the previous World Cup qualification cycle.

OFC
For the first time, the OFC will be granted one guaranteed slot directly into the World Cup, as opposed to the OFC winner having to play an intercontinental play-off in the qualification process.  A qualifying format is yet to be decided.

UEFA

The UEFA Executive Committee announced a new European qualification format on 25 January 2023. Teams will be drawn into twelve groups of four or five teams. The winner of each group will qualify for the World Cup, while the second-placed teams will either qualify directly or participate in play-off matches.

Due to the 2022 Russian invasion of Ukraine, Russia's national team is currently suspended and their participation is yet to be confirmed.

 First round (group stage): Twelve groups of either four or five teams with group winners qualifying for the World Cup finals.

Inter-confederation play-offs
A play-off tournament involving six teams will be held to decide the last two FIFA World Cup berths: these consist of one team per confederation, except for UEFA, and one additional team from the confederation of the host countries (CONCACAF).

Two of the teams will be seeded based on the World Rankings, and these seeded teams will play for a FIFA World Cup berth against the winners of the first two knockout games involving the four unseeded teams.

The four-game tournament is to be played in one or more of the host countries and to be used as a test event for the FIFA World Cup.

Notes

References 

 
Qualification
FIFA World Cup qualification